The African Badminton Championships is a tournament organized by the Badminton Confederation of Africa (BCA) to crown the best badminton players in Africa. For the Team event there is the African Badminton Cup of Nations. This is not to be confused with the All African Games, the multi sports event, held every four years where badminton is included since 2003. This tournament established since 1979 where Kumasi, Ghana held the competition. Kenyan men's and women's team emerged as the champion at the first edition.

Championships

Medal count (2011−2023)

In November 2019, Badminton World Federation released a statement regarding doping test failure of Kate Foo Kune in this championships and decided to disqualify her result in 2019 African Badminton Championships.

Previous winners

See also
Africa Continental Team Badminton Championships, another continental tournament
African Juniors Badminton Championships
African Seniors Badminton Championships

References

External links
2011

 
International badminton competitions
Badminton

Recurring sporting events established in 1979
1979 establishments in Africa